Revolution '67 is a 2007 documentary film about the black riots of the 1960s. With the philosophy of nonviolence giving way to the Black Power Movement, race riots were breaking out in Jersey City, Harlem, and Watts, Los Angeles. In 1967, black Newark, New Jersey taxi driver John Smith was arrested for a traffic violation and allegedly beaten and killed, precipitating the 1967 Newark riots. Revolution '67 details Newark's reaction to the incident.

Revolution '67 was produced, directed, shot and edited by Marylou and Jerome Bongiorno and was aired on PBS as part of its Point of View series.

References

External links 
 Revolution '67 - Film's website
 P.O.V. Revolution '67 - PBS's site dedicated to the film
 

2007 films
POV (TV series) films
Documentary films about African Americans
Documentary films about United States history
Films shot in Newark, New Jersey
Documentary films about New Jersey
2000s English-language films
2000s American films